Angela Bairstow (1942-2016) was an English international badminton player.

Badminton career
She first came to prominence in 1958 when she won the English National Junior singles title. Further wins followed in 1959 and 1960; in addition she won four English National Junior doubles titles. After the step up to senior competition she reached the final of the 1963 All England Badminton Championships singles losing out to Judy Hashman. In 1963 at the All England Championships she was seeded to win in the Singles, Doubles and the Mixed.

Although never winning an All England title Bairstow became a significant player for England winning a host of titles from 1964-1968 including the Scottish Open, German Open, Dutch Open, Asia Cup, Irish Open, English National Badminton Championships and European Badminton Championships.

In 1965 Bairstow won the Dutch open in Singles, Doubles and Mixed in the same year with another three Dutch titles afterwards. She repeated the triple at the second Asian Championships in 1965 in Lucknow. After which the organisers banned non-Asian players from entering.  Bairstow brought to prominence a deceptive backhand sliced serve and flick. She is the only player in history who won medals in both Asian and European Championships.

Bairstow represented England and won two golds and one silver medal, at the 1966 British Empire and Commonwealth Games in Kingston, Jamaica.

Personal life
She married her coach, H. Ian Palmer, in 1970 and had three children (born 1969, 1970 and 1972) and four grandchildren.

Medal Record at the All England Badminton Championships

References

English female badminton players
1942 births
Badminton players at the 1966 British Empire and Commonwealth Games
Commonwealth Games medallists in badminton
Commonwealth Games gold medallists for England
Commonwealth Games silver medallists for England
2016 deaths
Medallists at the 1966 British Empire and Commonwealth Games